The Stongafjell Tunnel is a  long road tunnel along County Road 562 in the municipality of Askøy in Vestland county, Norway. It was opened in December 1991 to connect this road to the newly constructed Askøy Bridge. In 2004, it had 11,050 vehicles per day, making it part of the section of road with the most traffic in all of Askøy municipality. In 2011, Hordaland County Municipality spent  to upgrade the electrical systems in the tunnel.

References

Road tunnels in Vestland
Tunnels completed in 1991
1991 establishments in Norway
Askøy
Norwegian County Road 562